The Bangor Community Hospital is a health facility in Castle Street, Bangor, Northern Ireland. It is managed by the South Eastern Health and Social Care Trust.

History
The facility, which was designed by Young and MacKenzie in the neo-Georgian style, was opened as Bangor Cottage Hospital in 1910. It was extended in 1925 and, after joining the National Health Service in 1948, it evolved to become Bangor Community Hospital. Despite a local campaign to stop the closure, a 20-bed inpatient ward was closed in June 2015.

References 

South Eastern Health and Social Care Trust
Hospitals established in 1910
1910 establishments in Ireland
Hospital buildings completed in 1910
Health and Social Care (Northern Ireland) hospitals
Hospitals in County Down
20th-century architecture in Northern Ireland